British NVC community MG4 (Alopecurus pratensis - Sanguisorba officinalis grassland) is one of the mesotrophic grassland communities in the British National Vegetation Classification system. It is one of four such communities associated with well-drained permanent pastures and meadows.

This community, although widespread in the past, now has a scattered distribution in the Midlands and southern England. One rare species rare species is associated with this community: snake's-head fritillary (Fritillaria meleagris) and six rare micro-species of dandelion, Taraxacum fulgidum, T. haematicum, T. melanthoides, T. sublaeticolor, T. subundulatum and T. tamesense.

There are four subcommunities.


Subcommunities

 the Dactylis glomerata subcommunity
The Cock’s-foot sub-community is the most species-rich of the four sub-communities and is generally found where the water table remains low throughout the growing season and flooding is rare. Distinguishing species that are constant include cock’s-foot (Dactylis glomerata) and yellow oat-grass (Trisetum flavescens). Meadow foxtail, (Alopecurus pratensis) which is included in the scientific name for the overall community is found only sparsely and patchily in this sub-community.

 the Typical subcommunity

The Typical sub-community, as its name implies, describes those stands closest in their species composition to the Burnet floodplain meadow community as a whole. However, stands of the Typical sub-community are less species-rich than those of the Cock’s foot sub-community, with on average 22 species per square metre, and there are no strongly preferential species

 the Holcus lanatus subcommunity
The Yorkshire fog sub-community has a high cover of grasses such as meadow foxtail (Alopecurus pratensis), rough-stalked meadow-grass (Poa trivialis) and creeping bent (Agrostis stolonifera). It tends to be associated with sites which experience a high water table for longer periods during the growing season than the two preceding sub-communities. It is less species-rich than the Cock’s-foot and Typical sub-communities.

 the Agrostis stolonifera subcommunity
The Creeping bent sub-community is the most species-poor. It tends to be associated with areas that experience prolonged inundation (which can also lead to higher soil fertility) and is especially characteristic of the Derwent Ings in Yorkshire.

Community composition

The following constant species are found in this community:

 Meadow foxtail (Alopecurus pratensis)
 Common mouse-ear (Cerastium fontanum)
 Crested dog's-tail (Cynosurus cristatus)
 Red fescue (Festuca rubra)
 Meadowsweet (Filipendula ulmaria)
 Yorkshire-fog (Holcus lanatus)
 Meadow vetchling (Lathyrus pratensis)
 Autumn hawkbit (Leontodon autumnalis)
 Perennial rye-grass (Lolium perenne)
 Ribwort plantain (Plantago lanceolata)
 Meadow buttercup (Ranunculus acris)
 Common sorrel (Rumex acetosa)
 Great burnet (Sanguisorba officinalis)
 Dandelion (Taraxacum officinale agg.)
 Red clover (Trifolium pratense)
 White clover (Trifolium repens)

References
 Rodwell, J. S. (1992) British Plant Communities Volume 3 - Grasslands and montane communities  (hardback),  (paperback)
 Rothero, E., Lake. S, and Gowing, D. (eds) (2016). Floodplain Meadows – Beauty and Utility. A Technical Handbook Milton Keynes, Floodplain Meadows Partnership  (paperback)

External links
 http://www.floodplainmeadows.org.uk/about-meadows/wildlife/plant-communities

MG04